The welterweight competition at the 2015 AIBA World Boxing Championships will be held from 7–15 October 2015. This is a qualifying tournament for the upcoming 2016 Summer Olympics. Mohammed Rabii of Morocco defeated Daniyar Yeleussinov of Kazakhstan to win the world title.

Medalists

Seeds

  Daniyar Yeleussinov
  Mohammed Rabii
  Gabriel Maestre (round of 16)
  Parviz Baghirov (semifinals)

Draw

Finals

Section 1

Section 2

Results

Ranking

References

External links
Official website

2015 AIBA World Boxing Championships